The USOPC Athlete of the Year (historically USOC Athlete of the Year) awards are part of a series of awards presented by the United States Olympic & Paralympic Committee to athletes who have distinguished themselves in one of the Olympic or Paralympic sports. Awards are presented to the Olympic or Paralympic SportsMan of the Year, SportsWoman of the Year, and Team of the Year.

Historically, all awards were presented annually. Starting in 2014, the award structure was changed as follows:
 Performances by the best athletes and teams in the Olympics and Paralympics are honored with the Team USA Awards—Athlete of the Olympic Games (both male and female), Team of the Olympic Games, Athlete of the Paralympic Games (both male and female), and Team of the Paralympic Games. These are presented in Olympic and Paralympic years (normally even-numbered, though the 2020 Summer Olympics have been delayed to 2021).
 The Athlete of the Year, Paralympian of the Year, and Team of the Year awards are presented in other years.

Nominees for each award are submitted by the national governing bodies of Olympic, Paralympic, and Pan American Games sports, and by their affiliated able-bodied and disabled sports organizations.  Winners are selected by a vote of the USOPC awards committee, consisting of USOPC representatives, media representatives, and Olympic athletes.

The SportsMan and SportsWoman of the Year awards were first presented in 1974; the Team of the Year award was added in 1996 and the Paralympian of the Year award was added in 2004. The Paralympian award was subdivided into men's and women's awards in 2009, with the Paralympic Team of the Year award added at that time.

SportsMan of the Year

1974 — Jim Bolding, athletics
1975 — Clinton Jackson, boxing
1976 — John Naber, swimming
1977 — Eric Heiden, speed skating
1978 — Bruce Davidson, equestrianism
1979 — Eric Heiden, speed skating
1980 — Eric Heiden, speed skating
1981 — Scott Hamilton, figure skating
1982 — Greg Louganis, diving
1983 — Rick McKinney, archery
1984 — Edwin Moses, athletics
1985 — Willie Banks, athletics
1986 — Matt Biondi, swimming
1987 — Greg Louganis, diving
1988 — Matt Biondi, swimming
1989 — Roger Kingdom, athletics
1990 — John T. Smith, wrestling (freestyle)
1991 — Carl Lewis, athletics
1992 — Pablo Morales, swimming
1993 — Michael Johnson, athletics
1994 — Dan Jansen, speed skating
1995 — Michael Johnson, athletics
1996 — Michael Johnson, athletics
1997 — Pete Sampras, tennis
1998 — Jonny Moseley, skiing (freestyle)
1999 — Lance Armstrong, cycling (road)
2000 — Rulon Gardner, wrestling (Greco-Roman)
2001 — Lance Armstrong, cycling (road)
2002 — Lance Armstrong, cycling (road)
2003 — Lance Armstrong, cycling (road)
2004 — Michael Phelps, swimming
2005 — Hunter Kemper, triathlon
2006 — Joey Cheek, speed skating
2007 — Tyson Gay, athletics
2008 — Michael Phelps, swimming
2009 — Todd Lodwick, skiing (Nordic combined)
2010 — Evan Lysacek, figure skating
2011-12 — Michael Phelps, swimming
2012-13 — Ted Ligety, skiing (alpine)
2014-15 — Jordan Burroughs, wrestling (freestyle)
2016 — Michael Phelps, swimming
2017 — Kyle Snyder, wrestling (freestyle)
 2018 — Shaun White, snowboarding
 2019 — Nathan Chen, figure skating

SportsWoman of the Year

1974 — Shirley Babashoff, swimming
1975 — Kathy Heddy, swimming
1976 — Sheila Young, speed skating
1977 — Linda Fratianne, figure skating
1978 — Tracy Caulkins, swimming
1979 — Cynthia Woodhead, swimming
1980 — Beth Heiden, speedskating
1981 — Sheila Young Ochowicz, cycling/speed skating
1982 — Melanie Smith, equestrian
1983 — Tamara McKinney, skiing (alpine)
1984 — Tracy Caulkins, swimming
1985 — Mary Decker Slaney, athletics
1986 — Jackie Joyner-Kersee, athletics
1987 — Jackie Joyner-Kersee, athletics
1988 — Florence Griffith Joyner, athletics
1989 — Janet Evans, swimming
1990 — Lynn Jennings, athletics
1991 — Kim Zmeskal, gymnastics (artistic)
1992 — Bonnie Blair, speed skating
1993 — Gail Devers, athletics
1994 — Bonnie Blair, speed skating
1995 — Picabo Street, skiing (alpine)
1996 — Amy Van Dyken, swimming
1997 — Tara Lipinski, figure skating
1998 — Picabo Street, skiing (alpine)
1999 — Jenny Thompson, swimming
2000 — Marion Jones, athletics
2001 — Jennifer Capriati, tennis
2002 — Sarah Hughes, figure skating
2003 — Michelle Kwan, figure skating
2004 — Carly Patterson, gymnastics (artistic)
2005 — Katie Hoff, swimming
2006 — Hannah Teter, snowboarding
2007 — Katie Hoff, swimming
2008 — Natalie Coughlin, swimming and Nastia Liukin, gymnastics (artistic)
2009 — Lindsey Vonn, skiing (alpine)
2010 — Lindsey Vonn, skiing (alpine)
2011-12 — Allyson Felix, track & field
2012-13 — Katie Ledecky, swimming
2014-15 — Simone Biles, gymnastics (artistic)
2016 — Katie Ledecky, swimming
2017 — Katie Ledecky, swimming
 2018 – Chloe Kim, snowboarding
 2019 — Simone Biles, gymnastics (artistic)

Team of the Year

 1996 — Women's National/Olympic Basketball Team
 1997 — Women's National Soccer Team
 1998 — Women's Olympic Ice Hockey Team
 1999 — U.S. Women's World Cup Team
 2000 — USA Baseball Olympic Team
 2001 — US Postal Service Cycling Team
 2002 — Women's Bobsled Team (Jill Bakken and Vonetta Flowers)
 2003 — Women's Gymnastics Team
 2004 — U.S. Olympic Softball Team
 2005 — Men's Badminton Doubles Team (T. Gunawan, H. Bach)
 2006 — U.S. Olympic Men's Curling Team
2007 — U.S. Women's World Championships Gymnastics
2008 — U.S. Olympic Men's Indoor Volleyball Team
2009 — U.S. Four-Man Bobsled Team (Steven Holcomb, Steve Mesler, Justin Olsen, Curt Tomasevicz)
2010 — U.S. Four-Man Bobsled Team (Steven Holcomb, Justin Olsen, Steve Mesler, Curt Tomasevicz)
2011-12 — Women's Eight Rowing Team
2012-13 — Men's Tennis Doubles Team (Bob and Mike Bryan)
2014-15 — U.S. Women's World Cup Team
2016 — U.S. Women's Gymnastics Team
2017 — Women's National Ice Hockey Team
2018 — Women's National Ice Hockey Team
 2019 — U.S. Women's World Cup Team

Paralympian of the Year
"These prestigious awards recognize the outstanding contributions these athletes have made to Olympic and Paralympic sport as well as the positive example they have set for all Americans,” said USOC Chief Executive Officer Jim Scherr. “Each of our winners exemplifies great sportsmanship and strength of character both on and off the field, and all are worthy additions to the distinguished list of past recipients."

2004 — Erin Popovich, swimming
2005 — Laurie Stephens, alpine skiing
2006 — Jessica Long, swimming
2007 — Jessica Galli, athletics
2008 — Erin Popovich, swimming

Paralympic SportsMan of the Year
2009 — Steve Cash, sled hockey
2010 — Taylor Chace, sled hockey
2011-12 — Raymond Martin, track & field
2012-13 — Raymond Martin, track & field

Male Paralympic Athlete of the Year
2014-15 — Joe Berenyi, cycling
2016 — Brad Snyder, swimming
2017 — Mikey Brannigan, track and field
 2018 — Dan Cnossen, Nordic skiing
 2019 — Ben Thompson, archery

Paralympic SportsWoman of the Year
2009 — Stephani Victor, alpine skiing
2010 — Alana Nichols, alpine skiing
2011-12 — Jessica Long, swimming
2012-13 — Monica Bascio, cycling

Female Paralympic Athlete of the Year
2014-15 — Tatyana McFadden, track and field
2016 — Tatyana McFadden, track and field
2017 — Tatyana McFadden, track and field
 2018 —Oksana Masters, Nordic skiing
 2019 —Oksana Masters, Nordic skiing

Paralympic Team of the Year
2009 — U.S. National Sled Hockey Team
2010 — U.S. Paralympic Sled Hockey Team
2011-12 — Men's Quad Doubles Tennis Team
2012-13 — U.S. Men's 4x100-Meter Relay Team
2014-15 — U.S. National Sled Hockey Team
2016 — U.S. Women's Sitting Volleyball Team
2017 — U.S. National Sled Hockey Team
 2018 — U.S. National Sled Hockey Team
 2019 — U.S. National Sled Hockey Team

See also

 United States Olympic Hall of Fame
 List of sports awards honoring women

References

External links
USOC OLYMPIAN ATHLETES OF THE YEAR

United States at the Olympics
United States at the Paralympics
American sports trophies and awards
Lists of award winners